Jon Knud Bøgh Fjeldså (born 13 December 1942) is a Norwegian-born Danish ornithologist and bird artist. He served in the Norwegian army as an intelligence agent in the 1960s, bringing into Norway information on the then newly released Russian weapon, the Kalashnikov (AK-47). Fjeldså authored a guide to the young of European birds and coauthored a book on the birds of the Andes with Niels Krabbe and has published numerous research papers including work on the evolution of the passerines. He is an emeritus professor at the University of Copenhagen.

Fjeldså was born in northern Norway in Hauge. Growing up during the war, he and his playmates played with ammunition and weapons found in the region. After schooling he served in the army on the Russian-Norwegian border in the early 1960s. His knowledge of Russian and excellent drawing skills led to his being chosen as an intelligence agent to go into Russia to document a new weapon being brought into use (the Kalashnikov AK-47). After delivering the document, he quit the intelligence service to study zoology at the University of Bergen, graduating in 1970. He then joined the Danish museum, inspired by Finn Salomonsen. In 1974 he received a doctorate for his studies on the Horned grebe. He became a professor of zoology at the University of Copenhagen in 1996. In 1990 he wrote and illustrated Birds of the High Andes along with Niels Krabbe. Along with others, he described Batis crypta from Tanzania.

References

External links 
 Biography at the website of the Annals of Improbable Research
 University staff web page
 Store danske
 Dansk biografisk lexikon
 Newsreport on Jyllands Posten with sketch of AK-47 by Fjeldså

1942 births
Living people
Danish expatriates in Norway
Danish ornithologists
Academic staff of the University of Copenhagen